Giovanni Battista Visconti or Giovanni Battista Antonio Visconti (17222 September 1784) was an Italian archaeologist and museum curator.

Biography
Giovanni Battista Visconti was born in 1722.

After the murder of Johann Joachim Winckelmann in 1768, Visconti succeeded him as the Papal States' Superintendent of Antiquities (Commissario delle Antichita), a post which he retained until his death in 1784. His main task was to reorganise and secure new acquisitions for the Vatican Museums and he became the first curator of the Museo Pio-Clementino, commissioning its neoclassical form. He also controlled the granting of export-licences to archaeologists and dealers throughout the Papal States - such as Gavin Hamilton and Thomas Jenkins.

A first volume of his catalogue of the Vatican collections appeared under his name in 1782; which was continued after his death by his son, Ennio Quirino Visconti. In his old age he was helped by both his sons, Ennio Quirino Visconti and Filippo Aurelio Visconti.

He died on 2 September 1784. After his death his son, Filippo Aurelio, succeeded his father as Commissario and in 1785 was made director of the Musei Capitolini.  Ennio Quirino eventually became director of the Musee Napoleon in Paris, to which many antiquities from Italy had been carried off by Napoleon.

Further reading
 I. Bignamini, C. Hornsby, Digging And Dealing in Eighteenth-Century Rome (2010), pp. 336–338
 C. Pietrangeli, The Vatican Museums: five centuries of history (1993)

External links
http://www.encyclopedia.com/doc/1E1-ViscontiE.html
https://web.archive.org/web/20121005034550/http://www.reocities.com/Paris/Gallery/5802/testo4.htm

1722 births
1784 deaths
Italian art curators
Italian archaeologists
Italian classical scholars